Andy Mallon (Irish Aindriu Ó Maoileoin) is an Irish Gaelic footballer who plays at senior level for the Armagh county team. He plays club football for Pearse Óg.

Playing career

Inter-county
Mallon made his Armagh senior debut in a 2003 National League game against Donegal. In 2004 he won the Ulster Senior Football Championship with the county.

In 2005 Mallon helped Armagh win the National League – with Mallon playing an excellent game in the final against Wexford. That year Armagh also defended the Ulster Championship. Mallon was awarded an All Star for his performances that season.

2006 saw Mallon earn a third Ulster Championship medal with Armagh. He won the Ulster Championship for a fourth time in 2008.

Club
Mallon has reached the Armagh Senior Football Championship final on a number of occasions with Pearse Óg, but they have been beaten by Crossmaglen each time.
That is until this year, 2009, when Pearse Óg beat Armagh Harps in the final 0.4 v 0.8.  They went on to play St Gall's of Belfast in the Ulster Championship. He is now playing for St Finians Swords . His direct influence has brought them to a Championship final.

Honours

County
 Ulster Senior Football Championship (4): 2004, 2005, 2006, 2008
 National Football League, Division 1 (1): 2005
 National Football League, Division 2 (1): 2010
 Ulster Under-21 Football Championship (1): 2004
 All-Ireland Under-21 Football Championship (1): 2004

Club
 Armagh Senior Football Championship (1): 2009

Individual
 All-Star (1): 2005
 Irish News Ulster All-Star (1): 2005

References

External links
Hogan Stand profile (March 2005)

Year of birth missing (living people)
Living people
Armagh inter-county Gaelic footballers
Pearse Og Gaelic footballers
People from Armagh (city)